The 2022 All-Ireland Senior Ladies' Football Championship was the 49th edition of the Ladies' Gaelic Football Association's premier inter-county ladies' Gaelic Football tournament. It took place in summer 2022 in Ireland.  retained the title they won in 2021.

Format

Provincial championships
The 13 teams first play in their provincial championships; Connacht (2 teams), Munster (4 teams) and Ulster (4 teams) each organise their provincial championship as a straight knockout.

In Leinster there are three teams in the provincial championship. They play each other in a round-robin phase, with two teams progressing to the final.

Group stage
The 13 teams are drawn into one group of four teams and three groups of three teams; seeding is based on performance in the provincial championships. Each team plays each other team in its group once, earning three points for a win and one for a draw.

Relegation
The last-placed teams in the groups played off to decide which two teams were relegated to the All-Ireland Intermediate Ladies' Football Championship.

Knockout stage
The top two in each group progress to the All-Ireland quarter-finals. Quarter-finals and semi-finals are "results on the day," with 20 minutes' extra time being played in the event of a draw, and a free-kick shootout being taken from a  distance in the event of a draw after extra time. If the All-Ireland final is a draw, the game is replayed.

Fixtures and results

Connacht Championship

Leinster Championship

Round robin

Final

Munster Championship

Ulster Championship

Group stage
Group games take place 11–25 June 2022.

Group 1

Group 2

Group 3

Group 4

Results

Relegation Playoffs

Finals

See also
2022 All-Ireland Intermediate Ladies' Football Championship
2022 All-Ireland Junior Ladies' Football Championship
2022 Ladies' National Football League

References

All Ireland
Ladies
Ladies